At the beginning of 2014–15 season, Aris Thessaloniki was going to play in Football League Greece as a result of the finish into the last season in the bottom of league table and the relegation. Although the team chose to play in Gamma Ethniki relieving from the huge debts it had accumulated in recent years.

Aris Thessaloniki was also going to compete in the Greek Football Cup. The draw was made and the team would play with Apollon Kalamaria. Owing to withdrawal from the Football League Greece the team lost both leg games of the First round with 3 – 0 (w/o). Finally, Aris Thessaloniki competed in the Gamma Ethniki Cup.

The club changed manager four times during the season. The season started with Dimitris Kalaitzidis as the manager of the club, but he was dismissed after the draw against Iraklis Ampelokipoi in 19 October 2014. Dimitrios Bougiouklis was the caretaker until the club hired the Brazilian Paulo Campos. Paulo Campos left the club due to the HFF's rules, which do not allow non-European managers to Gamma Ethniki's teams,  and replaced by Siniša Dobrašinović. The season finished with the return of Dimitris Kalaitzidis as manager, Siniša Dobrašinović as his assistant and the club's legend Dinos Kouis as Sporting director.

First-team squad

Competitions

Overall

Overview

{| class="wikitable" style="text-align: center"
|-
!rowspan=2|Competition
!colspan=8|Record
|-
!
!
!
!
!
!
!
!
|-
| Gamma Ethniki

|-
| Gamma Ethniki Cup

|-
! Total

Managers' overview

Dimitris Kalaitzidis
{| class="wikitable" style="text-align: center"
|-
!rowspan=2|Competition
!colspan=8|Record
|-
!
!
!
!
!
!
!
!
|-
| Gamma Ethniki

|-
| Gamma Ethniki Cup

|-
! Total

Dimitrios Bougiouklis
{| class="wikitable" style="text-align: center"
|-
!rowspan=2|Competition
!colspan=8|Record
|-
!
!
!
!
!
!
!
!
|-
| Gamma Ethniki

|-
| Gamma Ethniki Cup

|-
! Total

Paulo Campos
{| class="wikitable" style="text-align: center"
|-
!rowspan=2|Competition
!colspan=8|Record
|-
!
!
!
!
!
!
!
!
|-
| Gamma Ethniki

|-
| Gamma Ethniki Cup

|-
! Total

Siniša Dobrašinović
{| class="wikitable" style="text-align: center"
|-
!rowspan=2|Competition
!colspan=8|Record
|-
!
!
!
!
!
!
!
!
|-
| Gamma Ethniki

|-
| Gamma Ethniki Cup

|-
! Total

Gamma Ethniki

League table

Results summary

Results by matchday

Matches

Gamma Ethniki Cup

First round
In first round of the competition, the clubs in each Group competed against each other in single matches (overtime and penalties applied) until two clubs were declared Group winners. The competing pairs were selected as a result of random drawing that took place on 5 September 2014. The match days of the First Round were set on 28 September 2014 for Match-Day 1, 26 October 2014 for Match-Day 2 and 10 December 2014 for Match-Day 3.

Match-day 1

Match-day 2

Match-day 3

Quarterfinals
In the Second Round of the competition (Quarterfinals), the 8 Group winners competed against each other in single knock-out matches at the home ground of the club favored by the draw. All matches were held on 14 January 2015.

Squad statistics

Appearances

Goals

Kit

2014

|October–December

|
|

2015

|
|

References

External links
 Aris Thessaloniki F.C. official website

2014-15
Greek football clubs 2014–15 season